Charles Ruggles Boardman (October 28, 1860April 5, 1950) was an American journalist, businessman, and Army National Guard officer.  He served 16 years as Adjutant General of Wisconsin (1897–1913) and commanded the 64th Brigade of U.S. Infantry during .  In civilian life, he was a founder and president of the Wisconsin National Life Insurance Company.

Early life and education
Charles Ruggles Boardman was born in Empire, Fond du Lac County, Wisconsin, on October 28, 1860, to Colonel Napoleon Boardman and his wife Mary Louise ( Tallmadge). He attended Fond du Lac High School, graduating in 1878. He attended the University of Wisconsin–Madison and graduated with a Bachelor of Arts degree in 1884.

Civilian career
Boardman moved to Oshkosh, Wisconsin, in 1884 after graduating from the University of Wisconsin. In 1884, he was the city editor for the Daily Northwestern, the main daily newspaper in Oshkosh. In 1889, he became the secretary-treasurer of the paper. From 1884 to 1887, he also served as the newspaper's business manager.

In 1895, he helped found the Wisconsin National Life Insurance Company. He served as president of the company from 1908 to 1946. and president of the Globe Printing Company.

Military career
In 1879, he enlisted in the Wisconsin National Guard, joining a company called the "Fond du Lac Guards" as a private. In 1885, he was promoted to captain. By 1889, he had received a promotion to major.  On January 4, 1897, he was appointed Adjutant General of Wisconsin by Governor Edward Scofield.

He retired on October 1, 1913. He transferred to the National Guard Reserve on May 1, 1917, and was given command of the First Wisconsin Infantry Brigade.

He was sent to France during World War I. While overseas, he commanded the 64th Infantry Brigade as a brigadier general of the 32nd Infantry Division. He was relieved by General John A. Lejeune on August 11, 1918.

On August 13, 1918, he received an honorable discharge. He served for a total of thirty-eight years and was one of the oldest American general officers during World War I.

Personal life
Boardman's maternal grandfather was Nathaniel P. Tallmadge, who served as a United States senator from New York and was the 3rd Governor of the Wisconsin Territory. 

He married Adelaide Ryan Paige on July 13, 1888. Together, they had a son, Robert Paige Boardman, who was also an Army officer. His wife died in 1934.

Death and legacy
He died on April 5, 1950, in Oshkosh. He was interred at Riverside Cemetery in Oshkosh.

References 

1860 births
1950 deaths
People from Empire, Wisconsin
People from Oshkosh, Wisconsin
University of Wisconsin–Madison alumni
Editors of Wisconsin newspapers
Journalists from Wisconsin
Adjutants General of Wisconsin
Military personnel from Wisconsin
United States Army generals
National Guard (United States) generals
American military personnel of World War I
United States Army generals of World War I